André David Oliveira Ribeiro (born 9 June 1997) is a Portuguese professional footballer who plays as a forward for Bellinzona. He was born and raised in Switzerland and also holds the Swiss citizenship.

Club career
On 6 August 2017, Ribeiro made his professional debut with Braga B in a 2017–18 LigaPro match against União Madeira.

International career
He represented Portugal at the 2017 FIFA U-20 World Cup, where they reached quarterfinals.

References

External links

1997 births
People from Carouge
Sportspeople from the canton of Geneva
Citizens of Portugal through descent
Swiss people of Portuguese descent
Living people
Portuguese footballers
Portugal youth international footballers
Swiss men's footballers
Association football forwards
S.C. Braga B players
FC St. Gallen players
Grasshopper Club Zürich players
AC Bellinzona players
Liga Portugal 2 players
Swiss Super League players
Swiss Promotion League players
Swiss 1. Liga (football) players
Swiss Challenge League players